Lovell is the largest town in Big Horn County, Wyoming, United States. The population was 2,360 at the 2010 census.

History
Lovell was named for Henry Lovell, a local rancher.

Built in 1925, the EJZ Bridge over Shoshone River is listed on the National Register of Historic Places.

Geography
Lovell is located at  (44.836787, -108.392180).

Climate

According to the Köppen Climate Classification system, Lovell has a cold semi-arid climate, abbreviated "BSk" on climate maps.

Demographics

2010 census
At the 2010 census, there were 2,360 people, 909 households and 605 families living in the town. The racial makeup of the town was 94.0% White, 0.3% African American, 0.6% Native American, 0.6% Asian, 3.5% from other races, and 1.1% from two or more races. Hispanic or Latino of any race were 10.8% of the population.

There were 909 households, of which 33.6% had children under the age of 18 living with them, 51.5% were married couples living together, 11.0% had a female householder with no husband present, 4.1% had a male householder with no wife present, and 33.4% were non-families. 29.6% of all households were made up of individuals, and 13.3% had someone living alone who was 65 years of age or older. The average household size was 2.51 and the average family size was 3.13.

The median age was 36 years. 27.4% of residents were under the age of 18; 9.4% were between the ages of 18 and 24; 20.6% were from 25 to 44; 23.4% were from 45 to 64; and 19.3% were 65 years of age or older. The gender makeup of the town was 48.4% male and 51.6% female.

2000 census
At the 2000 census, there were 2,281 people, 896 households and 613 families living in the town. The population density was 2,141.6 per square mile (823.1/km2). There were 1,013 housing units at an average density of 951.1 per square mile (365.5/km2). The racial makeup of the town was 90.93% White, 0.04% African American, 0.70% Native American, 0.18% Asian, 0.13% Pacific Islander, 5.66% from other races, and 2.37% from two or more races. Hispanic or Latino of any race were 9.16% of the population.

There were 896 households, of which 31.9% had children under the age of 18 living with them, 54.9% were married couples living together, 9.6% had a female householder with no husband present, and 31.5% were non-families. 27.7% of all households were made up of individuals, and 15.6% had someone living alone who was 65 years of age or older. The average household size was 2.55 and the average family size was 3.14.

29.2% of the population were under the age of 18, 9.8% from 18 to 24, 22.0% from 25 to 44, 21.5% from 45 to 64, and 17.6% who were 65 years of age or older. The median age was 36 years. For every 100 females, there were 100.4 males. For every 100 females age 18 and over, there were 94.9 males.

The median household income was $30,745 and the median family income was $35,815. Males had a median income of $30,698 compared with $20,313 for females. The per capita income was $13,772. About 11.0% of families and 14.9% of the population were below the poverty line, including 19.5% of those under age 18 and 8.3% of those age 65 or over.

Arts and culture

Points of interest
 Bighorn Canyon National Recreation Area
 Big Horn Mountains
 Big Horn River
 Buffalo Bill Historical Center
 Hyart Theater
 Queen Bee Gardens

Education
Public education in the town of Lovell is provided by Big Horn County School District #2. Lovell is home to Lovell Elementary School (grades K-5), Lovell Middle School (grades 6–8), and Lovell High School (grades 9-12).

Lovell has a public library, a branch of the Big Horn County Library System.

Media
Radion station KWHO (107.1 FM) is licensed to Lovell.

Television stations airing in Lovell include KTVQ (CBS), KULR, (NBC), and KCWC-DT (PBS, local translator K19LM-D).

Notable people
 Don G. Despain (born 1940), botanist, ecologist
 Richard Kermode (1946–1996), keyboardist for Santana and other bands
 Kody Brown, reality TV personality in Sister Wives. The reality show family visited Kody's parents in Lovell in Season 3, episode 5.

In the media
The town was the center of a scandal in the 1980s when Dr. John Story was discovered to be sexually abusing patients. He was convicted on six separate charges of sexually assaulting his patients in 1985.

References

Further reading

External links
 The Lovell Chronicle newspaper

Towns in Big Horn County, Wyoming
Towns in Wyoming